Nachtmystium was an American psychedelic black metal band formed by Blake Judd, formerly known as Azentrius, and Pat McCormick. The band's name is derived from the German word Nacht meaning "night", and the made-up term mystium which resembles the Latin adjective mysticum. Judd and McCormick combined the words to create the band's name, which they state means "Encompassing Darkness". Nachtmystium released multiple critically praised albums between 2005 and 2012, including Instinct: Decay (2005), Assassins: Black Meddle, Part I (2008), and Silencing Machine (2012).

Controversy marred the band's success in 2013 when Judd was arrested for theft charges and publicly admitted he had a severe drug problem. Nachtmystium went on a four-year hiatus until 2017, when Judd reformed the band to record new studio material and perform at four concerts. Judd ultimately disbanded Nachtmystium in 2020.

History 
Nachtmystium was founded by Blake Judd and Pat McCormick as a side project. The band was heavily influenced by second-wave black metal bands, such as Darkthrone and Burzum, evidenced in their low-fi first release Reign of the Malicious in 2002. The band's next release, Demise (2004), was described by Judd as Nachtmystium's "last straight forward 'raw black metal' record." The band's following two releases, Eulogy IV (2004) and Instinct: Decay (2006), incorporated psychedelic and experimental musical elements that were pioneered by bands like Black Sabbath, The Doors and Pink Floyd. Instinct: Decay received general positive feedback from critics. DEAF SPARROW Zine praised the album for its innovation, while Decibel Magazine went even further to name Instinct: Decay as the fourth best album of 2006. The band released Assassins: Black Meddle, Part I  on June 10, 2008, in America. The album received a generally positive critical reception, especially from Pitchfork Media and MTV's Headbangers Ball, who both stated that it was one of the year's best releases.

Assassins success caused the band's popularity to increase. Nachtmystium played their first Scandinavian show in Bergen, Norway at the 2008 Hole in the Sky festival with At the Gates, Municipal Waste, and Meshuggah. Nachtmystium toured with Opeth, Baroness, and High on Fire for the first half of their American tour. In 2009, the band released a remastered version of Demise, with two extra tracks. and also released a new EP, entitled Doomsday Derelicts. The band experienced two major setbacks in February and March 2009. Nachtmystium was forced to withdraw from the Scion Rock Fest in Atlanta, Georgia due to alleged connections to National Socialist black metal (see Connection to NSBM section). Later that month, Judd injured his leg, forcing the band to cancel their tour with The Haunted.

In September 2009, Nachtmystium announced plans to release a follow-up album to Assassins: Black Meddle, Part I with an album titled Addicts: Black Meddle, Part II. Judd commented that the album would feature new material with "more of a rock and roll edge over all", and reflect the bands interest in post-rock and industrial music. The album debuted on June 8, 2010. The band played at the Inferno Festival in Oslo, Norway on April 3, 2010, where they shared the stage with Mayhem, Finntroll, and Taake. Nachtmystium also toured across the United States with Cradle of Filth and Turisas in early 2011.

Nachtmystium began recording for their new album in early 2011. The progress of the album was impeded by the departure of Judd's longtime band mate and friend, Jeff Wilson, who left Nachtmystium for personal reasons. Finally, in 2012, Nachtmystium released their sixth full-length studio album, Silencing Machine.  The album marked a departure from the band's previous two Black Meddle albums. Judd described the album as "a follow-up to Instinct: Decay". He further stated that the album has "still some psychedelic vibes here and there, but overall it's much more on par towards our older material". Silencing Machine was positively received by critics, including Sputnikmusic, AllMusic, and Popmatters. Pitchfork Media summarized their review of the album by stating, "Silencing Machine is an impressive and stylish reinvention of an earlier form by a band that could've easily lost the plot, but instead reigned in the excess, and wrote us a new one."

The band resumed production on a new studio album during the summer of 2013. However, Judd was arrested on October 5, 2013, on misdemeanor theft charges. The incident exposed Judd's heroin addiction to the public and forced him to seek drug rehabilitation. Nachtmystium canceled their remaining concerts while Judd focused on completing the band's next album, The World We Left Behind. After finalizing the album, Judd announced Nachtmystium was disbanding after a 13-year run on November 13. The World We Left Behind was released on August 5, 2014. The album garnered mixed critical reception. Critics were polarized by the album's song structure and lyrical composition. The Line of Best Fit praised The World We Left Behind, stating "[Nachtmystium] have returned to their best style — tempered, refined heavy rock that uses the finest extracts of black metal to supplement an already engrossing sound. Pitchfork Media  cited flaws such as  "the absence of transition and sequence, the lack of focus and coherence, the presence of awful lyrics and middling riffs.". The Quietus summed up the album stating, "it is predominately dull and uninspired. It is a truly forgettable album written during a time that its creator would clearly like to forget."

In late August, multiple fans complained that they failed to receive copies of The World We Left Behind that they purchased directly from Judd. Prior to his 2013 arrest, fans accused Judd of failing to fulfill purchase agreements without issuing refunds. Judd stated that he had run out of copies for distribution and was waiting for Century Media to deliver more copies to him. As more and more customers began to question the status of their orders, Judd and Nachtmystium's Facebook storefronts were abruptly shutdown without any explanation. On September 5, Century Media issued an official statement about the situation and asked fans to contact them directly about unfulfilled orders from Judd. The label also announced that they will no longer work with Nachtmystium to release and distribute new albums. Deadlight Entertainment, a French label that was producing and distributing band merchandise and albums, also announced they were cutting ties with Nachtmystium in wake of Judd's questionable past business practices and recent controversy.

Judd later admitted to selling merchandise to customers without intending to ever fulfill their orders. He claimed to have spent the stolen money on heroin until his scam exposed. In January 2016, Judd resurfaced to apologize to fans and reveal he was no-longer involved with the music industry. In April, Judd posted a compilation of previously unreleased Nachtmystium recordings and remixes on YouTube. On November 1, Judd announced that Earache Records had acquired the rights to redistribute Nachtmystium's five studio albums, as well as a new compilation album, titled Retox: Remixes and Rarities, which contains several remixes and covers that Judd previously released on YouTube. Judd also announced he would work with Earache Records to resolve unfulfilled merchandise. He released the following statement: "Thank you all for your patience and I do hope to make things right with everyone I can who fell victim to my addiction issues by not receiving orders for music or merchandise. I intend on giving away every single record and CD I receive of these reissues, if that's what it takes, to make things right with the fans whom I wronged and did not fulfill orders for."

In March 2017, Judd announced that Nachtmystium would re-unite after a four-year hiatus to play four live shows and record a new EP, titled Resilient. The band performed at the "Festum Carnis Open Air Festival" in Wilseyville, California on July 7 and the Louisville Death Fest in Louisville, Kentucky on September 29. While at Festum Carnis, Judd issued refunds to fans he defrauded and offered to reimburse their concert admission fee. Judd announced on September 11 that Nachtmystium had signed a new record deal with Prophecy Productions to distribute Resilient, which was released in November 2018.

Nachtmystium began working on the third installment of the Black Meddle series in early 2020. However, Judd abruptly disbanded Nachtmystium on June 14, 2020. He released a statement on the band's official Facebook page explaining his desire to move onto other musical projects and professional endeavors.

Musical style 
Nachtmystium's line-up has frequently changed since its formation. Furthermore, while the band originally started as a black metal band, and even toured with black metal acts such as Angelcorpse, Goatwhore and Watain, Judd has frequently stated that the band should not be considered black metal per se. In an interview with DEAF SPARROW Zine, Judd stated, "What separates us from your average black metal band is that we're NOT a black metal band, we're a 'do-whatever-the-fuck-we-want' metal band and black metal happens to be what we build our foundation off of (in the case of Instinct: Decay and its predecessors), if you must categorize the rhythm sections of our music (rhythm guitars, bass and drums — the core of any album)." J. Bennet of Decibel Magazine described the band's sound as "Blackadelia". Jason Bracelin, of the Las Vegas Review-Journal, compared the band's latter work to Pink Floyd, claiming, "[Assassins] is what happens when Pink goes black." Since the release of Assassins, the band has received additional press-coverage and attention from media outlets, including Metal Maniacs, Terrorizer, CMJ New Music Monthly, and Metalkult.com. Despite their departure from the black metal genre, Carlos Ramirez of IGN.com listed Assassins as one of the ten greatest black metal albums.

Judd recruited Chris Black to produce Nachtmystium's later albums and compose lyrics. Black's themes and lyrics from Addicts: Black Meddle, Part II were inspired by Judd's heroin addiction. Judd assumed songwriting duties for Nachtmystium's final studio album, The World We Left Behind, and included many lyrics about his personal struggles with addiction.

Connection to NSBM 
Nachtmystium's second demo, entitled Unholy Terrorist Cult, was unofficially re-released by Vinland Winds, an American National Socialist black metal (NSBM) record label, in 2001. Vinland Winds made CD-Rs without the band's knowledge and designed their own layout for the CD-Rs that were distributed with different cover art. In 2002, their first full-length album, Reign of the Malicious, was released on Regimental Records and then distributed by Unholy Records, who were an imprint of the white power skinhead label Resistance Records, and dealt mostly with National Socialist black metal bands. Judd claims that upon learning of the arrangement, he did not want Nachtmystium to become associated with a NSBM label, and demanded Resistance Records stop selling the band's albums.

In 2005, Metalreviews.com interviewed Judd to discuss Nachtmystium's recent work and background. During the interview, Judd dismissed MTV and the mainstream media as "Zionist means of demoralizing young American's [sic] artistic standards." He initially claimed the statement was taken out of context, but later remorsefully acknowledged and renounced his comment.

In 2006, Judd said, "In the past, we've had some indirect ties to labels and bands that are part of the NS scene. At one point not too many years ago, it wasn't uncommon for NS labels or bands to trade and work with non-politically motivated bands and labels because at the end of the day, we're all trying to promote, release, and be involved with music—all politics aside. Today it seems like there's less of a connection, at least for me and my label. We don't oppose people's right to be 'NS' or whatever—that's a personal choice, and if you live in the USA, you have the right to that opinion. Even though I personally, my band(s) and my label have absolutely no interest in being a part of that scene, I will ALWAYS take their side when it comes to their freedom of speech being imposed upon."

Just before the Atlanta, Georgia Scion Rock Fest on Saturday February 28, 2009, Nachtmystium was forced to cancel at the request of the festival's promoters, and sponsors, Toyota, on Tuesday February 23, 2008, due to an unnamed source, who believed the group was a "Nazi" band.  Judd promptly released a statement after the incident, stating, "We will be taking legal action against the people who slandered us in this situation, and in the future will file defamation / slander charges against any person or organization who attempts to prevent us from performing anywhere, especially in the United States. So – let it be known loud and clear for the LAST TIME, we ARE NOT a Nazi band, ARE NOT political, are certainly NOT racists and DO NOT support that world or any band, person or business affiliated with it." He also apologized to Nachtmystium fans who traveled to the concert to support the band.

Members 

Final lineup
Blake Judd – lead vocals, guitars (2000–2014, 2017–2020)
Martin von Falkenstein – bass, backing vocals (2017–2020)
Nolan Jenkins – drums (2018–2020)

Live members
Timothy "Scarecrow" Preciado – guitars (2013)
Pat Clancy – guitars
Markus Launsburry – bass guitar (2006), drums (2009)
Jon Woodring – bass guitar, vocals (2008–2009)
Zack Simmons – drums (2008–2009)
Sanford Parker – keyboards (2008–2011)
Andrew Markuszewski – bass guitar (2009–2011)
Charlie Fell – drums (2009–2011)
Bob Fouts – drums (2009)
Øystein Albrektsson – bass, backing vocals (2017)
Jacob Dye – guitars (2017–2020)
Pete Truax – bass (2017–2020)

Session musicians
Charlie Fell – drums (2011–2012)
Jef Stuart "Wrest" Whitehead – drums (2010)
Tony Laureano – drums (2008)
Scare Crow – guitars (2013)
Dustin Drenk – keyboards (2013)

Former members
Chris Black – bass guitar, keyboards (2005–2012)
Mike Legros – guitars  (2003–2004)
Zion Meagher – bass guitar (2000–2001)
Pat "Noctis" McCormick – drums (2000–2002)
Peter "Zmij" Kenar – vocals (2000–2001)
Marcus Matthew Kolar – bass guitar (2001–2002)
Kriglord – guitars, keyboards, vocals (2001–2002)
Matt "Xaphar" Block – drums (2002–2003)
David "Grave" Swanson – drums (2002)
Andrew Markuszewski – guitars, vocals (2002–2003, 2011–2013)
Wargoat Obscurum – drums (2003–2006)
Neill "N. Imperial" Jameson – bass guitar (2005)
Sinic – guitars (2006)
Jeff Wilson – guitars (2006–2010)
Sanford Parker – keyboards (2008–2013)
Pat Clancy – bass guitar, guitars (2010)
Reid Raley – bass guitar (2011–2012)
Will Lindsay – bass guitar (2012)
John Porada – bass guitar (2012–2013)
Sam Shroyer – drums (2013)
Jean-Michel Graffio – drums (2017–2018)
Phenex – keyboards (2017–2018)

Discography

Full-length albums 
 Reign of the Malicious (2002)
 Demise (2004)
 Instinct: Decay (2006)
 Assassins: Black Meddle, Part I (2008)
 Addicts: Black Meddle, Part II (2010)
 Silencing Machine (2012)
 The World We Left Behind (2014)

EP releases 
 Nachtmystium (2003); re-released together with Reign of the Malicious (2004)
 Eulogy IV (2004)
 Worldfall (2008)
 Doomsday Derelicts (2009)
 Resilient (2018)

Demos 
 Holocaust of Eternity (2000)
 Unholy Terrorist Cult (2001)

Split albums 
 Nachtmystium/Zalnik (with Zalnik) (2001)
 Nachtmystium/Xasthur (with Xasthur) (2004)
 Daze West (with Krieg) (2005)
 Nachtmystium/Murmur (2011)

Live releases 
 Live Onslaught (2002)
 Live Blitzkrieg (2003)
 Live Onslaught 2 (2005)
 Visual Propaganda: Live from the Pits of Damnation (DVD, 2005)
 Live at Roadburn MMX (LP and CD 2011)

Compilation albums 
 The First Attacks, 2000–2001 (2004)
 Retox: Remixes and Rarities (2017)

References

External links 

 Nachtmystium at discogs.com

Heavy metal musical groups from Illinois
American black metal musical groups
Musical groups established in 2000
Musical groups disestablished in 2014
Musical groups reestablished in 2017
Musical groups from Chicago
American psychedelic rock music groups
Century Media Records artists
Musical groups disestablished in 2020
Candlelight Records artists